Football 7-a-side competitions at the 2015 Parapan American Games in Toronto were held from 8 to 15 August at the Pan Am / Parapan Am Fields, which are located on the back campus of the University of Toronto. Football 7-a-side make its return to the program, after last being staged in 2007. The winner of the tournament will qualify for the 2016 Summer Paralympics in Rio de Janeiro, Brazil. As Brazil won the competition the second place Argentina qualified for the Paralympics.

Participating teams and officials

Qualifying
A total of five teams competed in the football seven a side competition. The host nation (Canada) automatically qualified a team. A team may consist of a maximum of 14 athletes.

Squads
The individual teams contact following football gamblers on to:

Venues
The venues to be used for the World Championships were located in Toronto.

Format

The first round, or group stage, was a competition between the 5 teams in one group, where engaged in a round-robin tournament within itself. The best two teams play for gold in the finals, the third and fourth place for the third place in the tournament, the fifth in the table is the fifth of the tournament.

Classification
Athletes with a physical disability competed. The athlete's disability was caused by a non-progressive brain damage that affects motor control, such as cerebral palsy, traumatic brain injury or stroke. Athletes must be ambulant.

Players were classified by level of disability.
C5: Athletes with difficulties when walking and running, but not in standing or when kicking the ball.
C6: Athletes with control and co-ordination problems of their upper limbs, especially when running.
C7: Athletes with hemiplegia.
C8: Athletes with minimal disability; must meet eligibility criteria and have an impairment that has impact on the sport of football.

Teams must field at least one class C5 or C6 player at all times. No more than two players of class C8 are permitted to play at the same time.

Group stage
In the first group stage have seen the teams in a one group of five teams.

Finals
Position 3-4

Final

Statistics

Ranking

See also

Football 7-a-side at the 2016 Summer Paralympics

References

External links
Football 7-a-side at 2015 Parapan American Games Toronto from 6 September 2015
Football 7-a-side at 2015 Parapan American Games Toronto (ifcpf.com)
Cerebral Palsy International Sports & Recreation Association (CPISRA)
International Federation of Cerebral Palsy Football (IFCPF)

Events at the 2015 Parapan American Games
2015